Velshi & Ruhle was a news program hosted by Ali Velshi and Stephanie Ruhle on MSNBC.

In 2019, the program's segment "Trump: 'Looking Very Seriously' at Changing Transgender Definition" was nominated in the Outstanding TV Journalism Segment category at the 30th GLAAD Media Awards.

References

External links
 Velshi & Ruhle at MSNBC

MSNBC original programming